Adolf Odermatt (17 June 1924 – 22 October 1998) was a former Swiss alpine skier. He competed in two events at the 1948 Winter Olympics.

References

1924 births
1998 deaths
Swiss male alpine skiers
Olympic alpine skiers of Switzerland
Alpine skiers at the 1948 Winter Olympics
People from Obwalden
20th-century Swiss people